Molus is an unincorporated community in  Harlan County, Kentucky, United States. The Molus Post Office is closed.

References

US Census of Harlan Co. and Whitley Co.,  and an 1855 affidavit of Ambrose Mullis support the phonetic rendition of Mullis as Molus as the origin of this community.

Unincorporated communities in Harlan County, Kentucky
Unincorporated communities in Kentucky
Coal towns in Kentucky